

173001–173100 

|-id=002
| 173002 Dorfi || 2006 OS || Ernst Dorfi (1956-2020), Austrian professor of theoretical astrophysics at the University of Vienna, promoter of astronomy || 
|-id=032
| 173032 Mingus ||  || Jose Antonio Lacruz Martin (born 1967), a member of the group of observers at Monte del Pardo, Madrid, who obtained his bachelor's degree in law at the Universidad Complutense de Madrid. || 
|-id=086
| 173086 Nireus ||  || Nireus, son of Aglaea and Charopus, mythological Greek king of Syme island, killed by Eurypylos during the Trojan war || 
|-id=094
| 173094 Wielicki ||  || Krzysztof Wielicki (born 1950) is a Polish mountaineer. He was fifth man in the world to climb all fourteen of the world's 8000-m mountains. || 
|}

173101–173200 

|-id=108
| 173108 Ingola || 6240 P-L || Ingeborg Walpurga Gasperi (1915–2002) grew up in Germany and Switzerland. In 1942 she married Mario Gasperi, an Italian engineer and expert in the construction of airplanes. || 
|-id=117
| 173117 Promachus ||  || Promachus, Greek warrior of the Iliad, killed by the Trojan hero Acamas || 
|}

173201–173300 

|-bgcolor=#f2f2f2
| colspan=4 align=center | 
|}

173301–173400 

|-id=395
| 173395 Dweinberg ||  || David Weinberg (born 1963), American astronomer with the Sloan Digital Sky Survey, known for theoretical interpretation of observed galaxy clustering || 
|}

173401–173500 

|-bgcolor=#f2f2f2
| colspan=4 align=center | 
|}

173501–173600 

|-bgcolor=#f2f2f2
| colspan=4 align=center | 
|}

173601–173700 

|-id=649
| 173649 Jeffreymoore ||  || Jeffrey M. Moore (born 1953) is a Research Scientist at the NASA Ames Research Center, who served as a Co-Investigator and Geology Science Team Lead for the New Horizons mission to Pluto. || 
|}

173701–173800 

|-bgcolor=#f2f2f2
| colspan=4 align=center | 
|}

173801–173900 

|-id=872
| 173872 Andrewwest ||  || Andrew A. West (born 1977), an American astronomer with the Sloan Digital Sky Survey || 
|}

173901–174000 

|-id=936
| 173936 Yuribo ||  || Yuribo, official mascot character of the town of Kuma Kogen, Japan || 
|}

References 

173001-174000